Raaton Ka Raja is a 1970 Bollywood drama film. The film stars
Dheeraj Kumar and Shatrughan Sinha.This is first film of Dheeraj Kumar. The movie was directed and produced by Rajesh Nahta and Rahul Dev Burman was the music director.

Cast 

 Shatrughan Sinha
 Dheeraj Kumar
 Rajendra Nath
 Jeevan (actor)
 Jayshree

Soundtrack

References

External links
 

1970 films
1970s Hindi-language films
1970 drama films
Films scored by R. D. Burman